Kao is a small coastal town on the eastern Indonesian island of Halmahera. It is located in the North Halmahera Regency, part of the province of North Maluku. It is connected by a coastal road to Tobelo, about an hour's drive to the north. Kao cemetery is located to the northwest of the town. During World War II, a Japanese military base was located at Kao Bay.

References

Populated places in North Maluku